Épretot is a commune in the Seine-Maritime department in the Normandy region in northern France.

Geography
Junction 6 of the A29 autoroute with the D31 road is within the commune's boundary.

Heraldry

Population

Places of interest
 The church of St. Pierre, dating from the twelfth century.

See also
Communes of the Seine-Maritime department

References

Communes of Seine-Maritime